War Outside may refer to:
 "War Outside", song from the King 810 album Memoirs of a Murderer
 "War Outside", song from the Kojey Radical album Reason to Smile